{{DISPLAYTITLE:C15H26O}}
The molecular formula C15H26O may refer to:

 Bisabolol (Levomenol)
 α-Cadinol
 δ-Cadinol
 τ-Cadinol
 Carotol
 Cedrol
 Cubebol
 Farnesol
 Guaiol
 Indonesiol
 Ledol
 Nerolidol
 Patchouli alcohol
 Viridiflorol

See also
 Cadinol